The Egyptian Royal Genealogy Project is a research project started by Egyptologist Christopher John "Chris" Bennett (1953–2014) in 2001.

History
The internet was meant as the medium for the project, which aimed at discussing new material related to the Ptolemaic dynasty as soon as they appeared, and provide direct access to primary sources for readers, such as inscriptions or papyri. The project was first hosted on the Yahoo! GeoCities with a mirror by Tyndale House. After the closure of GeoCities it became available only at the Tyndale House, which in 2019 moved the material to a sub-website, instonebrewer.com.

Many expressed their hope that the project will find its way to print; the founder, who died on 10 January 2014, stated that although he might think of it, printing is not his aim. The project was praised and recommended by academics, and its entries were cited by many scholars in academic works.

Selection of academic works citing the project

References

Citations

Sources

Ptolemaic dynasty